Mirzaani is a village in Georgia. It is located in Dedoplistsqaro Municipality, 15 kilometers from Dedoplistsqaro. Elevation: 750 meters. According to the 2014 census, 433 people lived in the village, the majority of whom are Georgians with a small Azeri minority.

Geography
The climate of the village is humid subtropical, with relatively cold winters and long warm summers. The average annual temperature is 10.1 degrees Celsius. The average January temperature is -1.5 degrees; 21.7 degrees in August. The absolute minimum temperature is -26 degrees, absolute maximum is +35 degrees. The amount of precipitation is 650 mm per year.

Culture
Georgian self-taught artist Niko Pirosmani (1862-1918) was born in Mirzaani. His house-museum works in the village, a monument designed by Vazha Mikaberidze is installed. Every October, the village hosts a traditional celebration “Pirosmanoba” (ფიროსმანობა), dedicated to the artist.

See also 
 Didnauri
 Vashlovani National Park

References

External links 

 About Sights – Niko Pirosmanashvili State Museum in Mirzaani ; Georgia About
 Districts of Georgia, Statoids.com

Cities and towns in Kakheti